Sea mew or seamew may refer to:

 Common gull, also called sea mew
 Supermarine Seamew, an amphibian seaplane
 Short Seamew, an anti-submarine aircraft
 Curtiss SO3C Seamew, a World War II floatplane
 HMS Seamew, two ships of the Royal Navy

See also
 SEA-ME-WE 3 (cable system), a telecommunications cable